Guam is an organized, unincorporated territory of the United States in the Micronesia subregion of the western Pacific Ocean. Guam's capital is Hagåtña, and the most populous village is Dededo. It is the westernmost point and territory of the United States, reckoned from the geographic center of the U.S.. In Oceania, Guam is the largest and southernmost of the Mariana Islands and the largest island in Micronesia. 

People born on Guam are American citizens but are politically disenfranchised, having no vote in the United States presidential elections while residing on Guam. Guam delegates to the United States House of Representatives have no vote on the floor. Indigenous Guamanians are the Chamoru, historically known as the Chamorro, who are related to the Austronesian peoples of Malay archipelago, the Philippines, Taiwan, and Polynesia. But unlike most of its neighbors, Chamorro language is not classified as a Micronesian or Polynesian language. Rather, like Palauan, it possibly constitutes an independent branch of the Malayo-Polynesian language family. As of 2022, Guam's population is 168,801. Chamorros are the largest ethnic group, but a minority on the multi-ethnic island. The Chamorro people settled the island approximately 3,500 years ago. Portuguese explorer Ferdinand Magellan, while in the service of Spain, was the first European to visit the island on March 6, 1521. Guam was colonized by Spain in 1668. Between the 16th and 18th centuries, Guam was an important stopover for the Spanish Manila Galleons. During the Spanish–American War, the United States captured Guam on June 21, 1898. Under the 1898 Treaty of Paris, Spain ceded Guam to the U.S. effective April 11, 1899.

Before World War II, Guam was one of five American jurisdictions in the Pacific Ocean, along with Wake Island in Micronesia, American Samoa and Hawaii in Polynesia, and the Philippines. On December 8, 1941, hours after the attack on Pearl Harbor, Guam was captured by the Japanese, who occupied the island for two and a half years. During the occupation, Guamanians were subjected to forced labor, incarceration, torture and execution. American forces recaptured the island on July 21, 1944, which is commemorated as Liberation Day. Since the 1960s, Guam's economy has been supported primarily by tourism and the U.S. military, for which Guam is a major strategic asset.

An unofficial but frequently used territorial motto is "Where America's Day Begins",      which refers to the island's proximity to the International Date Line. Guam is among the 17 non-self-governing territories listed by the United Nations, and has been a member of the Pacific Community since 1983.

History

Pre-Contact era 

Guam, along with the Mariana Islands, were the first islands settled by humans in Remote Oceania. It was also the first and the longest of the ocean-crossing voyages of the Austronesian peoples, and is separate from the later Polynesian settlement of the rest of Remote Oceania. They were first settled around 1500 to 1400 BC, by migrants departing from the Philippines. This was followed by a second migration from the Caroline Islands in the first millennium AD. A third migration wave took place from Island Southeast Asia, likely the Philippines or eastern Indonesia, by 900 AD.

These original settlers of Guam and the Northern Mariana Islands evolved into the Chamoru people, historically known as Chamorros after first contact with the Spaniards. The  were located in the coastal villages, which meant they had the best access to fishing grounds. The  were located in the island's interior.  and  rarely communicated with each other. The  often used  as intermediaries.

There were also "" or "", shamans with magical powers and "'" or "", healers who used different kinds of plants and natural materials to make medicine. Belief in spirits of ancient Chamorus called "" still persists as a remnant of pre-European culture. It is believed that "" or "" are the only ones who can safely harvest plants and other natural materials from their homes or "" without incurring the wrath of the "." Their society was organized along matrilineal clans.

The Chamoru people raised colonnades of megalithic capped pillars called  upon which they built their homes. Latte stones are stone pillars that are found only in the Mariana Islands. They are a recent development in Pre-Contact Chamoru society. The latte-stone was used as a foundation on which thatched huts were built. A possible source for these stones, the Rota Latte Stone Quarry, was discovered in 1925 on Rota.

Spanish era 

The first European to travel to Guam was Portuguese navigator Ferdinand Magellan, sailing for the King of Spain, when he sighted the island on March 6, 1521, during his fleet's circumnavigation of the globe. Despite Magellan's visit, Guam was not officially claimed by Spain until January 26, 1565, by Miguel López de Legazpi. From 1565 to 1815, Guam and the Northern Mariana Islands, the only Spanish outposts in the Pacific Ocean east of the Philippines, were reprovisioning stops for the Manila galleons, a fleet that covered the Pacific trade route between Acapulco and Manila.

Spanish colonization commenced on June 15, 1668, with the arrival of a mission led by Diego Luis de San Vitores, who established the first Catholic church. The islands were part of the Spanish East Indies, and part of the Viceroyalty of New Spain, based in Mexico City. The Spanish-Chamorro Wars on Guam began in 1670 over growing tensions with the Jesuit mission, with the last large-scale uprising in 1683.

Intermittent warfare, plus the typhoons of 1671 and 1693, and in particular the smallpox epidemic of 1688, reduced the Chamoru population from 50,000 to 10,000, and finally to less than 5,000. Up until the late 19th century, Guam was encountered by adventurers and pirates, including Thomas Cavendish, Olivier van Noort, John Eaton, William Dampier, Woodes Rogers, John Clipperton, George Shelvocke and William "Bully" Hayes.

The island became a rest stop for whalers starting in 1823. A devastating typhoon struck the island on August 10, 1848, followed by a severe earthquake on January 25, 1849, which resulted in many refugees from the Caroline Islands, victims of a resultant tsunami. After a smallpox epidemic killed 3,644 Guamanians in 1856, Carolinians and Japanese were permitted to settle in the Marianas.

American era 

After almost four centuries as part of the Kingdom of Spain, the United States occupied the island following Spain's defeat in the 1898 Spanish–American War, as part of the Treaty of Paris of 1898. Guam was transferred to the United States Navy control on December 23, 1898, by Executive Order 108-A from 25th President William McKinley.

Guam was a station for American merchants and warships traveling to and from the Philippines, which was another American acquisition from Spain, while the Northern Mariana Islands were sold by Spain to Germany for part of its rapidly expanding German Empire. A U.S. Navy yard was established at Piti in 1899. A United States Marine Corps barracks was established at Sumay in 1901. 

A marine seaplane unit was stationed in Sumay from 1921 to 1930, the first in the Pacific. The Commercial Pacific Cable Company built a telegraph/telephone station in 1903 for the first trans-Pacific communications cable, followed by Pan American World Airways establishing a seaplane base at Sumay for its trans-Pacific China Clipper route.

World War II 

During World War II, the Empire of Japan attacked and invaded in the 1941 Battle of Guam on December 8, at the same time as the attack on Pearl Harbor. The Japanese renamed Guam  (Great Shrine Island). The Japanese occupation of Guam lasted about 31 months. During this period, the indigenous people of Guam were subjected to forced labor, family separation, incarceration, execution, concentration camps, and forced prostitution.

Approximately 1,000 people died during the occupation, according to later US Congressional committee testimony in 2004. Some historians estimate that war violence killed 10% of Guam's then 20,000 population. The United States returned and fought the 1944 Battle of Guam from July 21 to August 10, to recapture the island. July 21 is now a territorial holiday, Liberation Day.

Post-war 
After World War II, the Guam Organic Act of 1950 established Guam as an unincorporated organized territory of the United States, provided for the structure of the island's civilian government, and granted the people U.S. citizenship. The Governor of Guam was federally appointed until 1968 when the Guam Elective Governor Act provided for the office's popular election. Since Guam is not a U.S. state, U.S. citizens residing on Guam are not allowed to vote for president and their congressional representative is a non-voting member. 

They do, however, vote for party delegates in presidential primaries. In 1969, a referendum on unification with the Northern Mariana Islands was held and rejected. During the 1970s, Dr. Maryly Van Leer Peck started an engineering program, expanded University of Guam, and founded Guam Community College.

The removal of Guam's security clearance by President John F. Kennedy in 1963 allowed for the development of a tourism industry. When the United States closed U.S. Naval Base Subic Bay and Clark Air Base bases in the Philippines after the expiration of their leases in the early 1990s, many of the forces stationed there were relocated to Guam.

The 1997 Asian financial crisis, which hit Japan particularly hard, severely affected Guam's tourism industry. Military cutbacks in the 1990s also disrupted the island's economy. Economic recovery was further hampered by devastation from Supertyphoons Paka in 1997 and Pongsona in 2002, as well as the effects of the September 11 terrorist attacks on tourism.

Geography and environment 

It is the 32nd largest island of the United States. It is the southernmost and largest island in the Mariana Island archipelago, as well as the largest in Micronesia. Guam's Point Udall is the westernmost point of the U.S., as measured from the geographic center of the United States.

The Mariana chain of which Guam is a part, was created by collision of the Pacific and Philippine Sea tectonic plates. Guam is located on the micro Mariana Plate between the two. Guam is the closest land mass to the Mariana Trench, the deep subduction zone that runs east of the Marianas. Volcanic eruptions established the base of the island in the Eocene, roughly 56 to 33.9 million years ago. The north of Guam is a result of this base being covered with layers of coral reef, turning into limestone, and then being thrust upward by tectonic activity to create a plateau.

The rugged south of the island is a result of more recent volcanic activity. Cocos Island off the southern tip of Guam is the largest of the many small islets along the coastline.

Politically, Guam is divided into 19 villages. The majority of the population lives on the coralline limestone plateaus of the north, with political and economic activity centered in the central and northern regions. The rugged geography of the south largely limits settlement to rural coastal areas. The western coast is leeward of the trade winds and is the location of Apra Harbor, the capital Hagåtña, and the tourist center of Tumon. The U.S. Defense Department owns about 29% of the island, under the management of Joint Region Marianas.

Climate

Guam has a tropical rainforest climate on the Köppen scale (Köppen Af). Its driest month of March almost qualifies as a tropical monsoon climate (Köppen Am). The weather is generally hot and humid throughout the year with little seasonal temperature variation. Guam is known to have equable temperatures year-round. Trade winds are fairly constant throughout the year. There is often a weak westerly monsoon influence in summer. 

Guam has two distinct seasons: Wet and dry season. The dry season runs from January through May. June is the transitional period. The wet season runs from July through November.

The most rainfall in a single day occurred on October 15, 1953, when  fell.

Temperatures rarely exceed  or fall below . The relative humidity commonly exceeds 84 percent at night throughout the year, but the average monthly humidity hovers near 66 percent.

The lowest recorded temperature was 65 °F (18.3 °C), set on February 8, 1973.

Guam lies in the path of typhoons and it is common for the island to be threatened by tropical storms and possible typhoons during the wet season. The highest risk of typhoons is from August through November, where typhoons and tropical storms are most probable in the western Pacific. They can, however, occur year-round. Typhoons that have caused major damage on Guam in the American period include the Typhoon of 1900, Karen (1962), Pamela (1976), Paka (1997), and Pongsona (2002).

Since Typhoon Pamela in 1976, wooden structures have been largely replaced by concrete structures. During the 1980s, wooden utility poles began to be replaced by typhoon-resistant concrete and steel poles. After the local Government enforced stricter construction codes, many home and business owners have built their structures out of reinforced concrete with installed typhoon shutters.

Ecology 

Guam has experienced severe impacts from invasive species upon the natural biodiversity of the island. These include the local extinction of endemic bird species after the introduction of the brown tree snake, an infestation of the Asiatic rhinoceros beetle destroying coconut palms, and the effect of introduced feral mammals and amphibians.

Wildfires plague the forested areas of Guam every dry season despite the island's humid climate. Most fires are caused by humans with 80% resulting from arson. Poachers often start fires to attract deer to the new growth. Invasive grass species that rely on fire as part of their natural life cycle grow in many regularly burned areas. Grasslands and "barrens" have replaced previously forested areas leading to greater soil erosion.

During the rainy season, sediment is carried by the heavy rains into the Fena Lake Reservoir and Ugum River, leading to water quality problems for southern Guam. Eroded silt also destroys the marine life in reefs around the island. Soil stabilization efforts by volunteers and forestry workers (planting trees) have had little success in preserving natural habitats.

Efforts have been made to protect Guam's coral reef habitats from pollution, eroded silt and overfishing, problems that have led to decreased fish populations. This has both ecological and economic value, as Guam is a significant vacation spot for scuba divers, and one study found that Guam's reefs are worth $127 million per year. In recent years, the Department of Agriculture, Division of Aquatic and Wildlife Resources has established several new marine preserves where fish populations are monitored by biologists. These are located at Pati Point, Piti Bomb Holes, Sasa Bay, Achang Reef Flat, and Tumon Bay. 

Before adopting U.S. Environmental Protection Agency standards, portions of Tumon Bay were dredged by the hotel chains to provide a better experience for hotel guests. Tumon Bay has since been made into a preserve. A federal Guam National Wildlife Refuge in northern Guam protects the decimated sea turtle population in addition to a small colony of Mariana fruit bats.

Harvest of sea turtle eggs was a common occurrence on Guam before World War II. The green sea turtle (Chelonia mydas) was harvested legally on Guam before August 1978, when it was listed as threatened under the Endangered Species Act. The hawksbill sea turtle (Eretmochelys imbricata) has been on the endangered list since 1970. In an effort to ensure the protection of sea turtles on Guam, routine sightings are counted during aerial surveys and nest sites are recorded and monitored for hatchlings.

Demographics

In the 2010 United States Census, the largest ethnic group were the native Chamorros, accounting for 37.3% of the population. Asians, including Filipinos, Koreans, Chinese, and Japanese, accounted for 33% of the population. Other ethnic groups of Micronesia, including those of Chuukese, Palauan, and Pohnpeians, accounted for 10%. 9.4% of the population were multiracial, (two or more races). White Americans made up 7.1% of the population. The estimated interracial marriage rate is over 40%.

The official languages of the island are English and Chamoru. Unlike most of its neighbors, Chamoru is not classified as a Micronesian or Polynesian language. Rather, like Palauan, it possibly constitutes an independent branch of the Malayo-Polynesian language family. Filipino is also commonly spoken across the island. Other Pacific and Asian languages are spoken in Guam as well. Spanish, which was the language of administration for 300 years, influenced the Chamoru language.

The predominant religion of Guam is Christianity. Three-quarters of the population adheres to Roman Catholicism, while most of the remainder belong to Protestant churches. According to the Pew Research Center, the religious demography of Guam in 2010 was as follows:

 Roman Catholicism: 75%
 Protestantism: 17.7%
 Other religions: 1.6%
 Folk religions: 1.5%
 Other Christianity: 1.4%
 Buddhism: 1.1%
 Eastern Orthodoxy: <1%
 Hinduism: <1%
 Islam: <1%
 Judaism: <1%

Culture

The culture of Guam is a reflection of traditional Chamoru customs, in combination with American, Spanish and Mexican traditions. Post-European-contact Chamoru Guamanian culture is a combination of American, Spanish, Filipino, other Micronesian Islander and Mexican traditions. Few indigenous pre-Hispanic customs remained following Spanish contact, but include plaiting and pottery. There has been a resurgence of interest among the Chamoru to preserve the language and culture.

The island's original community are Chamorro natives, who have inhabited Guam for almost 4000 years. They had their own language related to the languages of Indonesia and southeast Asia. The Spanish later called them Chamorros. A derivative of the word, Chamorri, means "noble race". They began to grow rice on the island.

Historically, the native people of Guam venerated the bones of their ancestors. They kept the skulls in their houses in small baskets, and practiced incantations before them when it was desired to attain certain objects. During Spanish rule (1668–1898) the majority of the population was converted to Catholicism and religious festivities such as Easter and Christmas became widespread. Many Chamorus have Spanish surnames, although few of the inhabitants are themselves descended from the Spaniards. Instead, Spanish names and surnames became commonplace after their conversion to Catholicism and the imposition of the Catálogo alfabético de apellidos in Guam. 

Historically, the diet of the native inhabitants of Guam consisted of fish, fowl, rice, breadfruit, taro, yams, bananas, and coconuts used in a variety of dishes. Post-contact Chamoru cuisine is largely based on corn, and includes tortillas, tamales, atole, and chilaquiles, which are a clear influence from Mesoamerica, principally Mexico, from Spanish trade with Asia.

Due to foreign cultural influence from Spain, most aspects of the early indigenous culture have been lost, though there has been a resurgence in preserving any remaining pre-Hispanic culture in the last few decades. Some scholars have traveled throughout the Pacific Islands, conducting research to study what the original Chamoru cultural practices such as dance, language, and canoe building may have been like.

Sports

Guam's most popular sport is American football, followed by basketball and baseball respectively. Soccer and other sports are also somewhat popular. Guam hosted the Pacific Games in 1975 and 1999. At the 2007 Games, Guam finished 7th of 22 countries in the medal count, and 14th at the 2011 Games.

Guam men's national basketball team and the women's team are traditional powerhouses in the Oceania region, behind the Australia men's national basketball team and the New Zealand national basketball team. , the men's team is the reigning champion of the Pacific Games Basketball Tournament. Guam is home to various basketball organizations, including the Guam Basketball Association.

The Guam national football team was founded in 1975 and joined FIFA in 1996. It was once considered one of FIFA's weakest teams, and experienced their first victory over a FIFA-registered side in 2009. Guam hosted qualifying games on the island for the first time in 2015 and, in 2018, clinched their first FIFA World Cup Qualifying win. The Guam national rugby union team played its first match in 2005 and has never qualified for a Rugby World Cup.

Economy

Guam's economy depends primarily on tourism, Department of Defense installations and locally owned businesses. Under the provisions of a special law by Congress, it is Guam's treasury rather than the U.S. treasury that receives the federal income taxes paid by local taxpayers, including military and civilian federal employees assigned to Guam.

Tourism

Lying in the western Pacific, Guam is a popular destination for Japanese tourists. Its tourist hub, Tumon, features over 20 large hotels, a Duty Free Shoppers Galleria, Pleasure Island district, indoor aquarium, Sandcastle Las Vegas–styled shows and other shopping and entertainment venues. It is a relatively short flight from Asia or Australia compared to Hawaii, with hotels and seven public golf courses accommodating over a million tourists per year.

75% of the tourists are Japanese. Guam also receives a sizable number of tourists from South Korea, the U.S., the Philippines, and Taiwan. Significant sources of revenue include duty-free designer shopping outlets, and the American-style malls: Micronesia Mall, Guam Premier Outlets, the Agana Shopping Center, and the world's largest Kmart.

The economy had been stable since 2000 due to increased tourism. It was expected to stabilize with the transfer of U.S. Marine Corps' 3rd Marine Expeditionary Force, currently in Okinawa, Japan (approximately 8,000 Marines, along with their 10,000 dependents), to Guam between 2010 and 2015. However, the move was delayed until late 2020. The number of marines decreased to 5,000, with the move expected to be complete in 2025. 

, Guam's largest single private sector employer with about 1,400 jobs, was Continental Micronesia, a subsidiary of Continental Airlines. It is now a part of United Airlines, a subsidiary of Chicago-based United Airlines Holdings, Inc.  the Continental Micronesia annual payroll in Guam was $90 million.

Budget and unemployment 
In 2003, Guam had a 14% unemployment rate, and the government suffered a $314 million budget shortfall. As of 2019 the unemployment rate had dropped to 6.1%. By September 2020, the unemployment rate had risen again to 17.9%.

Pacific migration to Guam 
The Compacts of Free Association between the United States, the Federated States of Micronesia, the Republic of the Marshall Islands, and the Republic of Palau accords the former entities of the Trust Territory of the Pacific Islands a political status of "free association" with the United States. The Compacts give citizens of these island nations generally no restrictions to reside in the United States, and its territories. Many people from other Pacific islands were attracted to Guam due to its proximity, environmental, and cultural familiarity. 

Over the years, it has been claimed by some in Guam that the territory has had to bear the brunt of this agreement, in the form of public assistance programs and public education for migrants from the regions involved. It has been argued that the federal government should compensate the states and territories affected by this type of migration.  Over the years, Congress has appropriated "Compact Impact" aid to Guam, the Northern Mariana Islands, and Hawaii. Eventually this appropriation was written into each renewed Compact. Some, however, continue to claim the compensation is not enough, or that the distribution of actual compensation received is significantly disproportionate.

Military bases 

These include:
 U.S. Naval Base Guam, U.S. Navy (Santa Rita), comprising the Orote Peninsula, additional lands, and with jurisdiction of the majority of Apra Harbor
 Andersen Air Force Base, U.S. Air Force (Yigo), including Northwest Field
 Marine Corps Base Camp Blaz, U.S. Marine Corps (Dededo)
 Ordnance Annex, U.S. Navy – South Central Highlands (formerly known as Naval Magazine)
 Naval Computer and Telecommunications Station Guam, U.S. Navy (Dededo), sometimes referred to "NCTS Finegayan"
 Naval Radio Station Barrigada (Barrigada), often referred to as "Radio Barrigada"
 Joint Region Marianas Headquarters (Asan), at Nimitz Hill Annex
 Naval Hospital Guam (Agana Heights)
 South Finegayan (Dededo), a military housing complex
 Andersen South (Yigo), formerly Marine Barracks Guam until its closure in 1992
 Fort Juan Muña, Guam National Guard (Tamuning)

In 2010, the U.S. military proposed building a new aircraft carrier berth on Guam and moving 8,600 Marines, and 9,000 of their dependents, to Guam from Okinawa, Japan. Including the required construction workers, this buildup would increase Guam's population by a total of 79,000, a 49% increase over its 2010 population of 160,000. In a February 2010 letter, the United States Environmental Protection Agency sharply criticized these plans because of a water shortfall, sewage problems and the impact on coral reefs. As of 2022, the Marine Corps has decided to place 5,000 Marines on the island within the first half of the 2020s, with 1,300 already stationed on the base.

Government and politics

Guam is governed by a popularly elected governor and a unicameral 15-member legislature, whose members are known as senators. Its judiciary is overseen by the Supreme Court of Guam.

The District Court of Guam is the court of United States federal jurisdiction in the territory. Guam elects one delegate to the United States House of Representatives, currently Republican James Moylan. The delegate does not have a vote on the final passage of legislation, but is accorded a vote in committee, and the privilege to speak to the House.

U.S. citizens in Guam vote in a presidential straw poll for their choice in the U.S. presidential general election, but since Guam has no votes in the Electoral College, the poll has no real effect. However, in sending delegates to the Republican and Democratic national conventions, Guam does have influence in the national presidential race. These delegates are elected by local party conventions.

Political status

In the 1980s and early 1990s, there was a significant movement in favor of this U.S. territory becoming a commonwealth, which would give it a level of self-government similar to Puerto Rico and the Northern Mariana Islands. In a 1982 plebiscite, voters indicated interest in seeking commonwealth status. However, the federal government rejected the version of a commonwealth that the government of Guam proposed, because its clauses were incompatible with the Territorial Clause (Art. IV, Sec. 3, cl. 2) of the U.S. Constitution. Other movements advocate U.S. statehood for Guam, union with the state of Hawaii, or union with the Northern Mariana Islands as a single territory, or independence.

A Commission on Decolonization was established in 1997 to educate the people of Guam about the various political status options in its relationship with the U.S.: statehood, free association, and independence. The island has been considering another non-binding plebiscite on decolonization since 1998. The group was dormant for some years. In 2013, the commission began seeking funding to start a public education campaign. There were few subsequent developments until late 2016. In early December 2016, the Commission scheduled a series of education sessions in various villages about the current status of Guam's relationship with the U.S. and the self-determination options that might be considered. The commission's current executive director is Edward Alvarez and there are ten members. The group is expected to release position papers on independence and statehood but the contents have not yet been completed.

The United Nations is in favor of greater self-determination for Guam and other such territories. The UN's Special Committee on Decolonization has agreed to endorse the Governor's education plan. The commission's May 2016 report states: "With academics from the University of Guam, [the Commission] was working to create and approve educational materials. The Office of the Governor was collaborating closely with the Commission" in developing educational materials for the public.

The United States Department of the Interior approved a $300,000 grant for decolonization education, Edward Alvarez told the United Nations Pacific Regional Seminar in May 2016. "We are hopeful that this might indicate a shift in [United States] policy to its Non-Self-Governing Territories such as Guam, where they will be more willing to engage in discussions about our future and offer true support to help push us towards true self-governances and self-determination."

On July 31, 2020, the Government of Guam joined the Unrepresented Nations and Peoples Organization (UNPO).

Villages

Guam is divided into 19 municipal villages:

 Agana Heights
 Asan‑Maina
 Barrigada
 Chalan Pago‑Ordot
 Dededo
 Hågat
 Hagåtña
 Humåtak
 Inalåhan
 Malesso'
 Mangilao
 Mongmong‑Toto‑Maite
 Piti
 Sånta Rita-Sumai
 Sinajana
 Talo'fo'fo
 Tamuning
 Yigo
 Yona

Transportation and communications

Most of the island has state-of-the-art mobile phone services and high-speed internet widely available through either cable or DSL. Guam was added to the North American Numbering Plan (NANP) in 1997. The country code 671 became NANP area code 671. This removed the barrier of high-cost international long-distance calls to the U.S. mainland.

Guam is a major hub for submarine cables between the Western U.S., Hawaii, Australia and Asia. Guam currently serves twelve submarine cables, with most continuing to China. In 2012 Slate stated that the island has "tremendous bandwidth" and internet prices comparable to those of the U.S. Mainland due to being at the junction of undersea cables.

In 1899, the local postage stamps were overprinted "Guam" as was done for the other former Spanish colonies, but this was discontinued shortly thereafter and regular U.S. postage stamps have been used ever since. Guam is part of the U.S. Postal System (postal abbreviation: GU, ZIP code range: 96910–96932). Mail to Guam from the U.S. mainland is considered domestic and no additional charges are required. Private shipping companies, such as FedEx, UPS, and DHL, however, have no obligation to do so, and do not regard Guam as domestic.

The speed of mail traveling between Guam and the states varies depending on size and time of year. Light, first-class items generally take less than a week to or from the mainland. Larger first-class or Priority items can take a week or two. Fourth-class mail, such as magazines, are transported by sea after reaching Hawaii. Most residents use post office boxes or private mail boxes, although residential delivery is becoming increasingly available. Incoming mail not from the Americas should be addressed to "Guam" instead of "USA" to avoid being routed the long way through the U.S. mainland and possibly charged a higher rate (especially from Asia).

The Port of Guam is the island's lifeline, because most products must be shipped into Guam for consumers. It receives the weekly calls of the Hawaii-based shipping line Matson, Inc. whose container ships connect Guam with Honolulu, Hawaii; Los Angeles, California; Oakland, California and Seattle, Washington. The port is also the regional transhipment hub for over 500,000 customers throughout the Micronesian region. The port is the shipping and receiving point for containers designated for the island's U.S. Department of Defense installations, Andersen Air Force Base and Commander, Naval Forces Marianas and eventually the Third Marine Expeditionary Force.

Guam is served by the Antonio B. Won Pat International Airport. The island is outside the United States customs zone, so Guam is responsible for establishing and operating its own customs and quarantine agency and jurisdiction. Therefore, the U.S. Customs and Border Protection only carries out immigration, but not customs functions. Since Guam is under federal immigration jurisdiction, passengers arriving directly from the United States skip immigration and proceed directly to Guam Customs and Quarantine.

Due to the Guam and CNMI visa waiver program for certain countries, an eligibility pre-clearance check is carried on Guam for flights to the States. For travel from the Northern Mariana Islands to Guam, a pre-flight passport and visa check is performed before boarding the flight to Guam. On flights from Guam to the Northern Mariana Islands, no immigration check is performed. Traveling between Guam and the States through a foreign point requires a passport.

Most residents travel within Guam using personally owned vehicles. The Guam Regional Transit Authority provides fixed route bus and paratransit services, and some commercial companies operate buses between tourist-frequented locations.

Education

Guam Public Library System operates the Nieves M. Flores Memorial Library in Hagåtña and five branch libraries.

The Guam Department of Education serves the entire island of Guam. In 2000, 32,000 students attended Guam's public schools, including 26 elementary schools, eight middle schools, and six high schools and alternative schools. Guam Public Schools have struggled with problems such as high dropout rates and poor test scores. 

An economic downturn in Guam since the mid-1990s has compounded the problems in schools.

Before September 1997, the U.S. Department of Defense partnered with the Guam Board of Education. In September 1997, the Department of Defense Education Activity (DoDEA) opened its own schools for children of military personnel. DoDEA schools, which also serve children of some federal civilian employees, had an attendance of 2,500 in 2000. DoDEA Guam operates three elementary/middle schools and one high school.

The University of Guam (UOG) and Guam Community College, both fully accredited by the Western Association of Schools and Colleges, offer courses in higher education. UOG is a member of the exclusive group of only 106 land-grant institutions in the entire United States. Pacific Islands University is a small Christian liberal arts institution, nationally accredited by the Transnational Association of Christian Colleges and Schools.

Health care

The Government of Guam maintains the island's main health care facility, Guam Memorial Hospital, in Tamuning. U.S. board certified doctors and dentists practice in all specialties. The U.S. Naval Hospital in Agana Heights serves active-duty members and dependents of the military community. 

There is one subscriber-based air ambulance located on the island, CareJet, which provides emergency patient transportation across Guam and surrounding islands. A private hospital, the Guam Regional Medical City, opened in early 2016. Medicaid is accepted in Guam.

See also

 51st state
 Index of Guam-related articles
 Lists of hospitals in the United States#Insular areas
 List of people from Guam
 Outline of Guam
 Voting in Guam

Notes

References

Further reading
 Maga, Timothy P. Defending Paradise: The United States and Guam, 1898–1950 (Garland, 1988).
 Rogers, Robert F. Destiny's Landfall: A History of Guam (U of Hawaii Press, 1995).
 Spear, Jane E. "Guamanian Americans." Gale Encyclopedia of Multicultural America, edited by Thomas Riggs, (3rd ed., vol. 2, Gale, 2014), pp. 263–273. online

External links

 
 Guampedia, Guam's Online Encyclopedia
 "Guam Society of America", fosters the CHamoru language, culture, and traditions
 The Insular Empire: America in the Mariana Islands, PBS documentary film website.
 Guam. The World Factbook. Central Intelligence Agency.
 U.S. Census Bureau: Island Areas Census 2000
 Geology and Hydrology of Guam
 
 Portals to the World: Guam from the U.S. Library of Congress. 
 
 
 Guam Census 

 
1898 establishments in Oceania
English-speaking countries and territories
Former Spanish colonies
Geography of Micronesia
Insular areas of the United States
Island countries
Islands of Oceania
Members of the Unrepresented Nations and Peoples Organization
Pacific islands of the United States
Small Island Developing States
States and territories established in 1898
World War II sites